Elisabetta Gonzaga (1471–1526) was a noblewoman of the Italian Renaissance, the Duchess of Urbino by marriage to Duke Guidobaldo da Montefeltro. Because her husband was impotent, Elisabetta never had children of her own, but did adopt her husband's nephew and heir, Francesco Maria I della Rovere. She was renowned for her cultured and virtuous life.

Life
Elisabetta was born in Mantua, Italy, the second daughter of Federico I Gonzaga, Marquess of Mantua and Margaret of Wittelsbach.  A member of the House of Gonzaga, she was a sister of Francesco II Gonzaga, Marquess of Mantua.

She married Guidobaldo da Montefeltro, the duke of Urbino, in 1489.  Guidobaldo was sickly and impotent, and they had no children, but Elisabetta refused to divorce him and nursed him through his illnesses. After his death, Elisabetta refused to marry.
 
Elisabetta's education led her to a life in the company of some the greatest minds of late 15th century Italy. Her court attracted writers, artists, and scholars. 
Her nobility gave her contact and involvement in the power politics of 16th century Italy. She was the sister-in-law of Isabella d'Este, an influential Renaissance patron and political figure. Despite having poor health, Elisabetta was known to be a great horsewoman and would frequently attend hunts in the countryside around Urbino.

On 21 June 1502 Cesare Borgia occupied Urbino, putting to flight Guidobaldo and forcing Elisabetta to remain in Mantua, where she had been staying as a guest. She remained there until 1503 and then joined Guidobaldo in Venice. They were restored to power in 1504. Having no children they adopted in the same year Francesco Maria I della Rovere, the child of Guidobaldo's sister, who was then fourteen, to secure the succession.

In 1502 Elisabetta reluctantly accompanied Lucrezia Borgia on her journey to Ferrara, where Lucrezia was married to Alfonso I d'Este. An eyewitness described her at the wedding thus:

Following Guidobaldo's death in 1508 at the age of 36  she  continued to live in Urbino as  regent to the underage heir.

In 1509 Francesco Maria I was married  to Eleonora Gonzaga, Elisabetta's niece, further consolidating the dynasty. Eleonora's mother was the first lady of the renaissance, Isabella d'Este.

However, in June 1516 she was expelled from Urbino by Pope Leo X, who wanted to give the duchy to his nephew Lorenzo de' Medici, Duke of Urbino (Lorenzo II di Piero, called "Lorenzino").  Together with her niece Eleonora Gonzaga and without a penny, they found refuge in Ferrara, where Elisabetta died in 1526.

Cultural references
Elisabetta Gonzaga was immortalized by the writer Baldassare Castiglione, whose  work of 1528, The Courtier, was based on his interactions and conversations with her.

A portrait of her around the years 1504 to 1506  is attributed to the artist Raphael and is in the Uffizi gallery, Florence, Italy.

References

Further reading
Sarah Bradford, Lucrezia Borgia, Milano, Mondadori, 2005. 
Maria Bellonci, Lucrèce Borgia (1991), 
David Englander,Culture and Belief in Europe, 1450-1600: An Anthology of Sources, Published by Blackwell Publishing, 1990  page 77
Paula Findlen, The Italian Renaissance: The Essential Readings, published by Blackwell Publishing, 2002,  page 35
 Marcia B. Hall, The Cambridge Companion to Raphael, published by Cambridge University Press, 2005,  page 29
 Baldassare Castiglione,The Book of the Courtier, Translated by Leonard Eckstein Opdycke, Published by Courier Dover Publications, 2003,  Page 320 (note 12 to page 2)

External links
Project Continua: Biography of Elisabetta Gonzaga Project Continua is a web-based multimedia resource dedicated to the creation and preservation of women's intellectual history from the earliest surviving evidence into the 21st Century.

1471 births
1526 deaths
E
Italian patrons of the arts
Nobility of Mantua
15th-century Italian women
16th-century Italian nobility
Duchesses of Urbino
Italian salon-holders